Danila Knyazev (born 18 June 2003) is a Russian professional footballer who plays as a midfielder for Orenburg-2.

References

External links

2003 births
Living people
Russian footballers
Association football midfielders
FC SKA Rostov-on-Don players
FC Minsk players
FC Orenburg players
Russian Second League players
Belarusian Premier League players
Russian expatriate footballers
Expatriate footballers in Belarus
Russian expatriate sportspeople in Belarus